Herb Guenther (April 9, 1941 – December 17, 2021) was an American politician who was a member of both the Arizona House of Representatives and the Arizona State Senate. He served in the House from January 1987 until January 1993. He was first elected to the House in November 1986, representing District 5, and was re-elected in 1990 and 1992. In 1998 he ran for the Arizona Senate, and was elected, representing District 5. He won re-election to the Senate in 2000, but did not run for re-election in 2002. He died on December 17, 2021, at the age of 80.

References

1941 births
2021 deaths
Democratic Party Arizona state senators
Democratic Party members of the Arizona House of Representatives
People from Mineola, New York